The Pontifical Mission Societies, known in some countries as Missio, is the name of a group of Catholic missionary societies that are under the jurisdiction of the Pope. These organizations include the Society for the Propagation of the Faith, the Society of St. Peter the Apostle, the Holy Childhood Association and the Missionary Union of Priests and Religious.

These four societies each received the title “pontifical” in 1922 to indicate their status as official instruments of the pope and of the universal Catholic Church. In most countries, the national director of the Pontifical Mission Societies heads the four societies, as is the case in the United States, and oversees the World Missions Sunday Collection, which is taken up on the third Sunday of October each year in every Catholic parish around the globe.

The Pope specifically asks the Pontifical Mission Societies to help bring the messages of Christ to the world, especially in countries where Christianity is new, young or poor.  The societies care for and support the younger churches until they are able to be self-sufficient.

The Pontifical Mission Societies raise awareness and foster prayer and cooperation in the whole Catholic Church, with 120 offices worldwide. It is the only organisation which supports every one of the 1,200 mission dioceses of the world. The Pontifical Mission Societies exist through the generosity of Catholics and plays a crucial role in combating poverty, disease, injustice and exploitation.

In April 2021, Monsignor Kieran E. Harrington of the Diocese of Brooklyn, was named the new national director of the Pontifical Mission Societies. The appointment was made by Cardinal Luis Antonio Tagle, prefect of the Vatican Congregation for the Evangelization of Peoples. Monsignor Harrington succeeded Father Andrew Small, OMI, who had completed his second five-year term.

Father Small, OMI, was appointed in 2011 as the National Director for the Pontifical Mission Societies in the United States.  In August 2013, Father Small travelled to Lisieux to collect the writing desk (the écritoire) of St. Thérèse of Lisieux, on which she wrote the spiritual classic Story of a Soul.  The Pontifical Mission Societies sponsored a tour of the desk in the United States from August to October 2013.

On 26 June 2012, Pope Benedict XVI appointed Bishop Protase Rugambwa, who until then had been serving as bishop of the Roman Catholic Diocese of Kigoma, Tanzania, as the Deputy Secretary of the Congregation for the Evangelization of Peoples and as President of the Pontifical Mission Societies, naming him an archbishop. He succeeded Archbishop Piergiuseppe Vacchelli. Rugambwa ceased to be president after being Secretary of the Congregation for the Evangelization of Peoples on 9 November 2017, with Giovanni Pietro Dal Toso replacing him. On Dec. 2, Pope Francis appointed Italian Father Emilio Nappa as adjunct secretary of the Dicastery for Evangelization with the office of president of the Pontifical Mission Societies. Until then, the Naples' born priest had been an official of the Vatican's Secretariat for the Economy.

Since Acp. Charles Asa Schleck's concurrent appointment as Undersecretary of the Congregation for the Evangelization of Peoples and President of the Pontifical Mission Societies, the two appointments have been concurrent (though with the title Adjunct Secretary):
Charles Asa Schleck (1995-2001)
Malcolm Ranjith (2001-2004)
Piergiuseppe Vacchelli (2004-2012)
Protase Rugambwa (2012-2017)
Giovanni Pietro Dal Toso (2017-2022)
Emilio Nappa (2022-present)

See also
 Ignaci Siluvai

References

External links

 US Pontifical Mission Societies
 PMS Canada
 Œuvres Pontificales Missionnaires en France
 Missio

Christian missionary societies